Oncidium micropogon is a species of orchid endemic to southeastern Brazil.

References

External links 

micropogon
Endemic orchids of Brazil